Jamshedpur West is one of the assembly constituencies which make up Jamshedpur Lok Sabha seat in  the Indian state of Jharkhand. Banna Gupta from Indian National Congress is the current MLA of this constituency.

Overview
According to the Delimitation of Parliamentary and Assembly Constituencies Order, 2008 of the Election Commission of India, Jamshedpur West Assembly constituency covers Jamshdepur Notified Area (excluding ward numbers 20 and 23 to 40). Jamshedpur West Assembly constituency is a part of Jamshedpur (Lok Sabha constituency).

Members of Assembly 
For Elections before 1967, please see Jamshedpur Assembly constituency

Election Results

2019

2014

See also
 Vidhan Sabha
 List of states of India by type of legislature
 Jamshedpur East Assembly constituency
 Jamshedpur Assembly constituency

References

 Schedule – XIII of Constituencies Order, 2008 of Delimitation of Parliamentary and Assembly constituencies Order, 2008 of the Election Commission of India 

Assembly constituencies of Jharkhand
Jamshedpur